Heian Maru can refer to:
 A number of steamships including:
SS Komagata Maru, a Japanese cargo ship in service 1924-26
, a Japanese cargo ship in service 1930-33
, a Japanese cargo ship in service 1917-45 or later
Heian Maru, a Japanese ocean liner launched in 1930 and sunk in 1944 while serving as a submarine tender
 MV Heian Maru, a number of ships with this name